Komba is an extinct genus of galagos, containing species known from the early to middle Miocene of Kenya and Uganda. A new species, K. walkeri, was described from the early Miocene of Kenya by Terry Harrison in 2010.

References

Prehistoric strepsirrhines
Lorises and galagos
Miocene primates of Africa
Prehistoric primate genera
Fossil taxa described in 1967
Miocene mammals of Africa